This is a list of Republic of Singapore Air Force squadrons.

Squadrons by alphabetical order
101 Squadron, Republic of Singapore Air Force
102 Squadron, Republic of Singapore Air Force
103 Squadron, Republic of Singapore Air Force
111 Squadron, Republic of Singapore Air Force
112 Squadron, Republic of Singapore Air Force
116 Squadron, Republic of Singapore Air Force
119 Squadron, Republic of Singapore Air Force
120 Squadron, Republic of Singapore Air Force
121 Squadron, Republic of Singapore Air Force
122 Squadron, Republic of Singapore Air Force
123 Squadron, Republic of Singapore Air Force
124 Squadron, Republic of Singapore Air Force  
125 Squadron, Republic of Singapore Air Force
126 Squadron, Republic of Singapore Air Force
127 Squadron, Republic of Singapore Air Force
128 Squadron, Republic of Singapore Air Force
130 Squadron, Republic of Singapore Air Force
131 Squadron, Republic of Singapore Air Force
140 Squadron, Republic of Singapore Air Force
141 Squadron, Republic of Singapore Air Force
142 Squadron, Republic of Singapore Air Force
143 Squadron, Republic of Singapore Air Force
144 Squadron, Republic of Singapore Air Force
145 Squadron, Republic of Singapore Air Force
149 Squadron, Republic of Singapore Air Force
150 Squadron, Republic of Singapore Air Force
160 Squadron, Republic of Singapore Air Force
163 Squadron, Republic of Singapore Air Force
165 Squadron, Republic of Singapore Air Force
200 Squadron, Republic of Singapore Air Force
201 Squadron, Republic of Singapore Air Force
202 Squadron, Republic of Singapore Air Force
203 Squadron, Republic of Singapore Air Force
505 Squadron, Republic of Singapore Air Force
506 Squadron, Republic of Singapore Air Force
507 Squadron, Republic of Singapore Air Force
508 Squadron, Republic of Singapore Air Force
605 Squadron, Republic of Singapore Air Force
606 Squadron, Republic of Singapore Air Force
607 Squadron, Republic of Singapore Air Force
608 Squadron, Republic of Singapore Air Force
705 Squadron, Republic of Singapore Air Force
706 Squadron, Republic of Singapore Air Force
707 Squadron, Republic of Singapore Air Force
708 Squadron, Republic of Singapore Air Force
805 Squadron, Republic of Singapore Air Force
806 Squadron, Republic of Singapore Air Force
807 Squadron, Republic of Singapore Air Force
808 Squadron, Republic of Singapore Air Force
809 Squadron, Republic of Singapore Air Force
815 Squadron, Republic of Singapore Air Force
816 Squadron, Republic of Singapore Air Force
817 Squadron, Republic of Singapore Air Force
819 Squadron, Republic of Singapore Air Force
RSAF Black Knights

Squadrons by Air Base

Changi Air Base
112 Squadron, Republic of Singapore Air Force
121 Squadron, Republic of Singapore Air Force
145 Squadron, Republic of Singapore Air Force
208 Squadron, Republic of Singapore Air Force
508 Squadron, Republic of Singapore Air Force
608 Squadron, Republic of Singapore Air Force
708 Squadron, Republic of Singapore Air Force
808 Squadron, Republic of Singapore Air Force

Paya Lebar Air Base
122 Squadron, Republic of Singapore Air Force
142 Squadron, Republic of Singapore Air Force (disbanded in 2005 at TAB and reestablished in 2016 at PLAB)
149 Squadron, Republic of Singapore Air Force
207 Squadron, Republic of Singapore Air Force
507 Squadron, Republic of Singapore Air Force
607 Squadron, Republic of Singapore Air Force
707 Squadron, Republic of Singapore Air Force
807 Squadron, Republic of Singapore Air Force
817 Squadron, Republic of Singapore Air Force

Sembawang Air Base
1 Medical Squadron, Republic of Singapore Air Force
120 Squadron, Republic of Singapore Air Force
123 Squadron, Republic of Singapore Air Force
124 Squadron, Republic of Singapore Air Force  
125 Squadron, Republic of Singapore Air Force
126 Squadron, Republic of Singapore Air Force
127 Squadron, Republic of Singapore Air Force
206 Squadron, Republic of Singapore Air Force
506 Squadron, Republic of Singapore Air Force
606 Squadron, Republic of Singapore Air Force
706 Squadron, Republic of Singapore Air Force
806 Squadron, Republic of Singapore Air Force
816 Squadron, Republic of Singapore Air Force

Tengah Air Base
111 Squadron, Republic of Singapore Air Force
116 Squadron, Republic of Singapore Air Force
119 Squadron, Republic of Singapore Air Force
140 Squadron, Republic of Singapore Air Force
143 Squadron, Republic of Singapore Air Force
205 Squadron, Republic of Singapore Air Force
505 Squadron, Republic of Singapore Air Force
605 Squadron, Republic of Singapore Air Force
705 Squadron, Republic of Singapore Air Force
805 Squadron, Republic of Singapore Air Force
815 Squadron, Republic of Singapore Air Force
RSAF Black Knights

Overseas detachments
130 Squadron, Republic of Singapore Air Force
150 Squadron, Republic of Singapore Air Force
Peace Carvin II detachment
Peace Carvin V detachment
Peace Vanguard detachment
Oakey detachment

Air Support/Air Defence
128 Squadron, Republic of Singapore Air Force
160 Squadron, Republic of Singapore Air Force
163 Squadron, Republic of Singapore Air Force
165 Squadron, Republic of Singapore Air Force
200 Squadron, Republic of Singapore Air Force 
201 Squadron, Republic of Singapore Air Force
202 Squadron, Republic of Singapore Air Force
203 Squadron, Republic of Singapore Air Force
3rd Divisional Air Defence Artillery Battalion, Republic of Singapore Air Force
6th Divisional Air Defence Artillery Battalion, Republic of Singapore Air Force
9th Divisional Air Defence Artillery Battalion, Republic of Singapore Air Force
18th Divisional Air Defence Artillery Battalion, Republic of Singapore Air Force

References

External links
RSAF Helicopter squadrons

Singapore Air Force

Republic of Singapore Air Force squadrons